Dictation can refer to:
Dictation (exercise), when one person speaks while another person transcribes
Dictation: A Quartet, a collection of short stories by Cynthia Ozick, published in 2008
Digital dictation, the use of digital electronic media for dictation
Music dictation, an ear training exercise in which the student copies down music while listening to it

See also
Dictatorship